Elizabeth Castor (née Bowe; born May 11, 1941) is an American educator and former politician. Castor was elected to the Florida Senate and as Florida Education Commissioner, and she subsequently served as the President of the University of South Florida, and President of the National Board for Professional Teaching Standards.

Her public service included three terms in the Florida State Senate and one term as a Hillsborough County Commissioner. In 2004, she was the Democratic nominee for the open U.S. Senate seat of retiring Senator Bob Graham and was narrowly defeated by Mel Martinez.

After leaving elected politics, Castor was the director of the Patel Center for Global Solutions at the University of South Florida and later became chair of the J. William Fulbright Scholarship Board. She also works with Ruth's List Florida, a group dedicated to recruiting and aiding qualified Democratic women candidates, receiving the Architect of Change Award  from them in May 2018.

Early life
Castor was born and grew up in Glassboro, New Jersey, the daughter of Gladys F. (née Wright) and Joseph L. Bowe. Her father was the mayor of Glassboro.

Education
She attended Glassboro State College (now Rowan University), earning her bachelor's degree. While at Glassboro she was active in organizing a drive to support education in Uganda. President John F. Kennedy appointed her to a diplomatic mission to attend the independence celebrations in Kampala, Uganda in 1962.

Following her graduation in 1963, she attended Teachers College, Columbia University for a summer and subsequently went back to Uganda and taught secondary school as part of the Teachers for East Africa program.  While in East Africa, Castor participated in a project to help lead two dozen African school girls to the summit of Tanzania's Mount Kilimanjaro, the first all-female expedition to accomplish this.

She returned to the U.S. in 1965, married Donald Castor, and moved to Dade County, Florida where she was a teacher while studying for her Master of Education degree at the University of Miami. She and her first husband had three children: Kathy Castor, who has been a Democratic U.S. Representative since 2007; Karen Castor Dentel, who is a former member of the Florida House of Representatives and current school board member of the Orange County Public Schools in Orlando, Florida; and Frank Castor, who is a judge in Palm Beach County. In 1989 Castor, who divorced in 1978, married Samuel P. Bell III, an attorney, and partner at Pennington, Moore, Wilkinson, Bell & Dunbar (a Tallahassee law firm).

Career
After receiving her Master's Degree in 1968, Castor moved with her family to Tampa, where she joined the League of Women Voters's Tampa chapter, becoming its president in 1970. Castor's second daughter, Karen, was born in 1968 and her son, Frank, who currently serves as judge in Palm Beach County, Florida, in 1970. In 1972, she ran for the Hillsborough County Commission.  An advocate of environmental protection and governmental reform, Castor faced ten opponents in the Democratic Primary and faced a general election opponent as well.  She won all the contests, becoming the first woman ever elected to the County Commission.  During her term, she chaired the Environmental Protection Commission and became chair of the Board of County Commissioners in 1976.  Later in 1976 she was elected to the State Senate and served until 1978 when she ran unsuccessfully for Lieutenant Governor.  She was elected again to the Florida Senate in 1982 and became the president pro tempore of the Senate in 1985, the first woman to hold the post.  Castor served on numerous education committees and became chair of the appropriations sub-committee on education.  She was the co-sponsor of the Equal Rights Amendment (1977) and championed bills to end discrimination and fund spouse abuse centers statewide.  She successfully sponsored legislation providing for the early childhood education program.

In 1986, Castor was elected statewide to the Florida Cabinet as Florida Education Commissioner, the first woman ever elected to the state cabinet.  As Commissioner of Education, Castor served on the Board of Regents and as a member of the Community College Coordination Board.  She worked with the legislature to fund the first statewide program to provide funding for the early childhood education program.  She worked also with the Insurance Commissioner to develop the Healthy Kids program, providing health insurance for low-income children enrolled in public schools.

President of the University of South Florida
In 1994 Castor became the first female president of the University of South Florida, one of the largest universities in the southeast with an enrollment of over 40,000 students, four campuses and a medical school. During her tenure, USF gained the Research I designation and the endowment tripled from US$65 million to just over US$200 million.  The Honors Program was expanded dramatically and a major expansion of residential on-campus housing was approved.  USF joined its sister institution, the University of Central Florida, in creating an academic and economic partnership, the I-4 High Technology Corridor.  She pursued international exchanges with institutions in China, led a delegation of faculty and staff to the African Economic Summit in Harare, Zimbabwe and encouraged new opportunities for USF faculty to study abroad.

National Board for Professional Teaching Standards
From 1999 to 2002 Castor served as president for the National Board for Professional Teaching Standards. The mission of the board is to build a system of high standards for education and encourage teachers throughout America to pursue its rigorous certification process. The number of board certified teachers grew under Castor's leadership from about 2070 to 25,000 by 2003. Financial incentives were developed in 48 states and hundreds of school districts.

Senate campaign, 2004

In the 2004 Senate campaign, Castor faced two Democratic candidates, Miami-Dade mayor Alex Penelas, Hollywood Congressman Peter Deutsch, and businessman Bernard Klein in the Democratic primary election.

Castor won the Democratic nomination on August 31. She was defeated, however, by Republican candidate Mel Martinez by 49.5% to 48.4% on November 2, 2004. The overwhelming support for Martinez among Latinos effectively counterbalanced Castor's relatively high popularity among swing voters throughout the state.

Patel Center for Global Solutions
In January 2007, Betty Castor was appointed the Executive Director at the Patel Center for Global Solutions at the University of South Florida.

In June 2009, Castor resigned as executive director of the Patel Center, returning her focus back to education and politics.

References

External links
Betty Castor Collection at the University of South Florida

|-

|-

1941 births
20th-century American politicians
20th-century American women politicians
21st-century American politicians
21st-century American women politicians
Candidates in the 2004 United States elections
County commissioners in Florida
Florida Commissioners of Education
Democratic Party Florida state senators
Living people
People from Glassboro, New Jersey
Politicians from Tampa, Florida
Presidents of the University of South Florida
Rowan University alumni
Teachers College, Columbia University alumni
Women state legislators in Florida
Women heads of universities and colleges